Hipólito Ramos Martínez (born January 30, 1956) is a retired boxer from Cuba, who won the silver medal in the Light Flyweight division (-48 kg) at the 1980 Summer Olympics in Moscow. In the final he lost to Shamil Sabirov of the Soviet Union on points (2-3).

Olympic results
Below are the results of Hipólito Ramos, a Cuban light flyweight boxer who competed at the 1980 Moscow Olympics:

 Round of 16: Defeated Farid Salman Mahdi (Iraq) on points, 5-0
 Quarterfinal: Defeated Gyorgy Gedo (Hungary) on points, 5-0
 Semifinal: Defeated Ismail Mustafov (Bulgaria) on points, 4-1
 Final: Lost to Shamil Sabirov (Soviet Union) on points, 2-3 (was awarded silver medal)

References

1956 births
Living people
Olympic boxers of Cuba
Boxers at the 1980 Summer Olympics
Olympic silver medalists for Cuba
Olympic medalists in boxing
Cuban male boxers
Medalists at the 1980 Summer Olympics
Light-flyweight boxers